Mangatyanan is a 2009 Philippine independent film written (under the pseudonym Ramon Ukit), directed, edited (under Pats R. Ranyo), and scored by Jerrold Tarog. The title refers to a Mangatyanan "blood trail" ritual of the Labwanan tribe, which plays an integral role in the plot. Both ritual and tribe were invented for the film.

Mangatyanan was a finalist in the full-length feature category of the 2009 Cinemalaya Philippine Independent Film Festival.

Plot
The film tells the story of Himalaya "Laya" Marquez, a 27-year-old travel photographer who projects a cold, aloof persona to her family and workmates. The beginning of the film reveals that she is estranged from her mother Luzviminda, and her father, the famous Photographer Danilo Marquez.  The film also reveals that she hasn't had a complete dream or a full night's sleep since age 12.

Things come to a head for Laya when Danilo suffers from a heart attack.  Although she pays for his hospital bills, she refuses to see him at the hospital, which leads to even further strain between her and Luzviminda.  It is revealed that Danilo used to visit Laya in her bedroom in the small hours of the night in order to abuse her - a fact which leads Laya's Luzviminda thinking that Danilo was seeing another woman, but not knowing that "the other woman" was in fact her daughter.

Not long after, Laya and new co-worker, Eric, assigned by their boss,  Queen, to document the Mangatyanan blood trail ritual of the Labwanan, fictional Filipino tribe created for the story, before the practice dies out forever.  When the pair meet the Labwanan, they discover a severely dwindled group whose cultural identity is now asserted only by their tribal leader Mang Renato.  While documenting the ritual, Laya feels a connection between the tribe's predicament and her own.

When the disagreements and moral failures among the Labwanan lead to the disruption of the Mangatyanan ritual, Laya and Eric are asked to leave. Before finally leaving the tribe however, Laya runs away and takes it upon herself to perform the steps Mangatyanan ritual,  one of the final steps of which is drinking a potentially fatal hallucigenic concoction.

While Eric and the tribesmen attempt to resuscitate Laya, the effects of the drink give her a vision of her Edwary woody, who asks for her forgiveness,  When she refuses, he instead convinces her to forgive her mother, which finally allows Laya to experience dignity and personal freedom.

Production
The Blood Trail was shot over the course of ten days, partly in Manila, and partly in Zambales. Manila locales include EDSA, the Metro Rail Transit, and various establishments near the Elisabeth Seton school. Zambales locales included Anawangin Cove PAndaquit Casa San Miguel and Capones Island.

As Director, writer, composer, editor, and sound designer (credited under different names), Jerrold Tarog had a great deal of control over many aspects of the film, but recognized that the other people who made the film were as much its creators as he was, saying "There's no such thing as an Auteur."

Fictional Tribe, Language, and Ritual
In a disclaimer at the end of the film's credits, Director Tarog notes that: "The Labwanan Tribe of Dimacan, their languages and customs, including the Mangatyanan Ritual are products of fiction created for the purpose of allegory. They do not represent real indigenous tribes of the Philippines."  In the two commentary tracks on the DVD, he claims that the language of the Labwanan was created from a mix of Kapampangan and Bisaya, and then modified slightly.

Cast
Che Ramos as Himalaya "Laya" Marquez
Neil Ryan Sese as Eric
Irma Adlawan as Luzviminda Marquez
Publio Briones III as Mang Ramon
Pen Medina as Danilo Marquez
Mailes Kanapi as Queen
Bor Ocampo as Junel
Madeleine Nicolas as Manang Nida
Ronald Legaspi as Mang Igo
Julia Enriquez as Chits
Danielle Afuang as Young Laya

Accolades

Awards
Festival Finalist - The Blood Trail - Cinemalaya Cinco 2009
Best Production Design - Benjamin Padero - Cinemalaya Cinco 2009 - “for effectively creating the physical and oppositional terrains for the urban and rural, and the real and mystical, in a story of a young girl’s coming to terms with her own troubled past."
Best Editing - Jerrold Tarog (credited as Pats R. Ranyo) - 8th Gawad Tagapuring mga Akademik ng Aninong Gumagalaw (2009 Gawad Tanglaw)

Nominations
Best Actress - Che Ramos - 33rd Gawad Urian Awards (2010) 
Digital Movie Cinematographer of the Year - Mackie Galvez - 26th Philippine Movie Press Club Star Awards (2010)

See also
 Jerrold Tarog
 Sana Dati
 Confessional (film)
 Senior Year (2010 film)
 Cinema of the Philippines

References

External links
 
 

2009 films
2009 drama films
Films about families
Films directed by Jerrold Tarog
Incest in film
Philippine drama films
Philippine independent films
Philippine New Wave
2000s Tagalog-language films